The 2014 Tour of the Basque Country was the 54th edition of the Tour of the Basque Country. It started on 7 April 2014 in Ordizia and ended on 12 April in Markina-Xemein, and consisted of six stages, including a race-concluding individual time trial. It was the ninth race of the 2014 UCI World Tour season.

Contador won the general classification by 49 seconds over runner-up Michał Kwiatkowski while 's Jean-Christophe Péraud completed the podium, 15 seconds behind Kwiatkowski and 64 seconds down on Contador. Kwiatkowski and Péraud had both started the final stage outside the top three placings, but moved up due to their more proficient performances in the time trial.

With five third place finishes from the six stages, Kwiatkowski was also the winner of the white jersey for the points classification, taking the lead on the final stage from the 's Alejandro Valverde; Valverde also dropped from second to fifth overall in the general classification.  rider Davide Villella was the winner of the mountains classification, having held that lead from start to finish, while the sprints classification was won for the second year in a row by a rider from the wildcard team ; Omar Fraile won the classification, after Amets Txurruka had done so in 2013.

Teams
As the Tour of the Basque Country was a UCI World Tour event, all 18 UCI ProTeams were invited automatically and obligated to send a squad. Only  was given a wildcard place, thus completing the 19-team peloton.

The 19 teams that competed in the race were:

Stages

Stage 1
7 April 2014 — Ordizia to Ordizia,

Stage 2
8 April 2014 — Ordizia to Urdazubi,

Stage 3
9 April 2014 — Urdazubi to Vitoria-Gasteiz,

Stage 4
10 April 2014 — Vitoria-Gasteiz to Eibar,

Stage 5
11 April 2014 — Eibar to Xemein,

Stage 6
12 April 2014 — Xemein, individual time trial (ITT)

Classification leadership table
In the 2014 Tour of the Basque Country, four different jerseys were awarded. For the general classification, calculated by adding each cyclist's finishing times on each stage, the leader received a yellow jersey. This classification was considered the most important of the 2014 Tour of the Basque Country, and the winner of the classification was the winner of the race.

Additionally, there was a points classification, which awarded a white jersey. In the points classification, cyclists received points for finishing in the top 15 in a stage. For winning a stage, a rider earned 25 points, second place earned 20 points, third 16, fourth 14, fifth 12, sixth 10, and one point fewer per place down to a single point for 15th. There was also a mountains classification, the leadership of which was marked by a red jersey with white dots. In the mountains classification, points were won by reaching the top of a climb before other cyclists, with more points available for the higher-categorised climbs.

The fourth jersey represented the sprints classification, marked by a blue jersey. In the sprints classification, cyclists received points for finishing in the top 3 at intermediate sprint points during each stage, with the exception of the final individual time trial stage. There was also a classification for teams, in which the times of the best three cyclists per team on each stage were added together; the leading team at the end of the race was the team with the lowest total time.

References

External links
 

Tour of the Basque Country by year
Tour of the Basque Country
Tour of the Basque Country